Youlbury Scout Activity Centre is one of a number of The Scout Association's National Scout Activity Centres in the United Kingdom and is the oldest permanent Scout campsite in the world (while Brownsea Island was the site of the first campsite, it was a private island for many years after).

The Centre, which is based near Oxford, is open to Scouts from around the world, and offers many activities as well as camping and accommodation in huts.

History
The site was first used as a meeting place and camping field in 1913 when the site owner, Sir Arthur Evans, had a cabin built for a local Scout patrol. This building was demolished in the 1980s, but many other of the original buildings still stand.

Since then, the site has been developed and expanded to accommodate large gatherings of Scouts, offering activities such as swimming, archery, shooting, climbing, and more.

Milestones
 1913 - the log cabin for the Scouts is built
 1919 - Gilwell Park, a centre for Scoutmaster training is founded
 1925 - Baden-Powell approaches the landowner to use Youlbury as another training centre
 1939 - Gilwell Park is commandeered by the Army, and the Scout Movement move their headquarters to Youlbury
 1941 - Sir Arthur Evans dies, leaving instructions that site be sold to the Scout Movement for a "reasonable price"
 1946 - Headquarters returns to Gilwell Park
 2013 - Youlbury celebrates its centenary as a scout camp site

Location

Youlbury is situated in a wooded area just north of Boars Hill, about 5 miles west of Oxford.

Facilities

Campsites
Youlbury has a large number of fields and sites spread around the woodland.

Each camping area has designated fire circles, and have shared toilet and washing facilities.

Indoor accommodation
There are a number of buildings with varying facilities available on the site. This provides for the younger sections who require alternative indoor accommodation when camping, and also for training purposes.

 The Lawn Hut - was originally a Croquet pavilion and was the building which the Scouts had asked to be allowed to use before having the log cabin built. It has a kitchen and main hall, but no beds
 Camp Headquarters Building - Staff accommodation. No access to members of the public
 The Gulf Building - a self-contained chalet with 6 rooms of 2 beds and 3 rooms of 6, a kitchen, and indoor hall
 The Brazier Building - 4 rooms of 4, 1 room of 2, kitchen and hall. This building is alongside The Lawn Hut -No longer available for group hire
 The Training Centre - This was closed to groups due to water damage
 The Activity Barn - A large hall with a bouldering wall and indoor archery range.
 Bear's Den - Replaced the old den and museum in 2013. Sleeps fifty in ensuite rooms
The Centenary Lodge, a building that sleeps 36, large kitchen, main room, boot room with wash/dry facilities, en suites on every room, and a large decking area to the rear.

Activities
The site offers a number of activities on or near site, all properly supervised:

 Climbing and Abseiling
 Go-Karts
 Air Rifle Shooting (Indoor Range)
 Assault Course
 Archery
 Pioneering
 Orienteering
 Aerial Trek
 3G Swing
 Jacobs Ladder
 Crate Stacking

Sailing is also available nearby, and there is the CuriOXity Science Centre in Oxford, and a rural farm museum nearby.

Staff
The site is overseen by a Centre Manager, who manages a small permanent staff who maintain the site and supervise the various activities.

Over the summer months, as the site is much busier, volunteers are recruited from nearby Scout and Guide Groups and from international members of Scouting or Guiding.

See also

 Baden-Powell House - hostel and conference centre for Scouting
 Brownsea Island Scout camp - the birthplace of World Scouting
 Downe Scout Activity Centre
 Ferny Crofts Scout Activity Centre
 Gilwell Park - the current home of UK Scouting

External links
 Official Youlbury Scout Activity Centre Website
  Official Website of The Scout Association

Scout Activity Centres of The Scout Association